In Arkansas folklore, the White River Monster is a large creature reportedly first spotted off the banks of the White River near Newport in northeastern Arkansas.

Although reported in the press as a "monster", it is reported to be deeply loved by neighborhood residents near this portion of the White River, and the monster is referred to locally as "Whitey".

History
Some believe the White River Monster may have affected the Civil War. The river was used for transportation, and the monster was supposedly responsible for overturning a boat. Sightings of the monster began in 1915.  On July 1 of that year, an owner of a plantation near the river saw the monster. He reported it having gray skin and "as wide as a car and three cars long." As the news spread construction of a rope net began, but ended due to lack of money and materials.

In the first week of 1937, recreational fishermen noticed that they were finding it hard to land many fish, and the creature was spotted again, and reported to Bramlett Bateman, a nearby plantation owner, who later confirmed the sighting, describing it as having "the skin of an elephant, four or five feet wide by twelve feet long, with the face of a catfish, . . .  lolling on the surface of the water."  Feeling the creature was a threat to his crops, he intended to blow up the eddy where the creature was spotted with TNT, but area authorities denied necessary permission.  A minor media sensation resulted in visitors from across the nation, some bringing cameras, explosives, and a machine gun, and when no more sightings were made, when a plan to capture it with a giant net failed, and when a deep sea diver failed to find the creature, Bateman was thought to have created a hoax, despite over 100 confirmed sightings recorded during the short period of excitement.

The White River Monster was sighted again in the summer of 1971. That year, eyewitnesses who encountered the creature described it as "the size of a boxcar" with a bone protruding from its forehead. "It looked as if the thing was peeling all over, but it was a smooth type of skin or flesh," said one, and it made strange noises that sounded like a combination of a "cow's moo and a horse's neigh." Other accounts of the White River Monster described three-toed tracks,  in length, on Towhead Island leading down to the river through a path of bent trees and crushed bushes.

In 1973, the Arkansas State Legislature signed into law a bill by state Senator Robert Harvey, creating the White River Monster Refuge along the White River. The area is located between "the southern point on the river known as Old Grand Glaize and a northern point on White River known as Rosie." It is illegal to harm the monster inside the refuge.

Identification
While the existence of the creature is not controversial, the question has arisen as to identifying it with a known species. Biologist Roy Mackal was persuaded that the monster was an elephant seal. Joe Nickell has criticized this conclusion due to the White River being well out of the range of elephant seals. His conclusion is that the monster(s) were Florida manatees, also known as "sea cows".

In fiction
Rommel, Keith "White River Monster" Pennsylvania: Sunbury Press, 2015, pp. 22. 3 part short story series. ASIN: B012QGP8GQ 
The White River Monster was featured in the 2009 Lost Tapes episode, "White River Monster".
The White River Monster features in author J.K. Rowling's writings as a magical creature whose spines are used as wand cores by American wizards.
American True Storys

References

Arkansas culture
History of Arkansas
American legendary creatures
Legendary reptiles